Texcalyacac is a municipality in Mexico State in Mexico. The municipality covers an area of  17.99 km2.

As of 2005, the municipality had a total population of 4,514.

References

Municipalities of the State of Mexico
Populated places in the State of Mexico